Malik Ellison (born August 17, 1996) is an American professional basketball player for the College Park Skyhawks of the NBA G League. He played college basketball for the St. John's Red Storm, the Pittsburgh Panthers, and the Hartford Hawks.

Early life and high school career
Raised in Voorhees Township, New Jersey, Ellison was nicknamed “Missile,” and attended Life Center Academy in Burlington. He missed the beginning of his senior season with a broken tibia, not returning to the court until December 2014. In January 2015, Ellison scored 28 points and tallied in a 60–54 win against Orangeville Prep at the Spalding Hoophall Classic. As a senior, he averaged 20 points, 7 rebounds and 4 assists per game. Ellison committed to playing college basketball for St. John's, choosing the Red Storm over offers from Maryland, Seton Hall, Temple, Xavier and South Carolina.

College career
Ellison started nine games as a freshman and averaged 7.3 points, 2.5 rebounds and 2.6 assists per game. As a sophomore, Ellison averaged 7.4 points and 2.5 assists per game. He transferred to Pittsburgh after the season. Ellison made 16 starts as a junior and averaged 5.8 points, 3.8 rebounds and 1.2 assists per game. He provided energetic defense on the perimeter but struggled with his shooting, hitting 44.5 percent of his attempts from the floor, and his production declined during Atlantic Coast Conference play. Following the season, he transferred to Hartford as a graduate transfer. Ellison missed the start of his senior season due to a sprained ankle. On January 25, 2020, he scored a career-high 31 points and had 12 rebounds in a 62–48 win over Albany. As a senior, Ellison averaged 18.7 points and 9.7 rebounds per game, and scored in double figures in all but three games. He was named to the First Team All-America East as well as receiving NABC All-District 1 honors.

Professional career
On September 29, 2021, Ellison signed his first professional contract with BC Kolín of the Czech National Basketball League.

In October 2021, he joined the College Park Skyhawks of the NBA G League. In 14 games, he averaged 10.5 points and 4.9 rebounds in 29.7 minutes per game (.505 FG%, .423 3FG%, .640 FT%).

On December 25, 2021, Ellison signed a 10-day contract with the Atlanta Hawks but did not appear in a game for the team during this stint.

On January 4, 2022, Ellison was reacquired by the College Park Skyhawks.

On September 16, 2022, Ellison signed with the Atlanta Hawks. He was waived on October 9, 2022.

Career statistics

College

|-
| style="text-align:left;"| 2015–16
| style="text-align:left;"| St. John's
| 24 || 9 || 21.3 || .369 || .318 || .653 || 2.5 || 2.6 || .4 || .1 || 7.3
|-
| style="text-align:left;"| 2016–17
| style="text-align:left;"| St. John's
| 33 || 26 || 24.8 || .419 || .341 || .595 || 3.3 || 2.5 || .9 || .2 || 7.4
|-
| style="text-align:left;"| 2017–18
| style="text-align:left;"| Pittsburgh
| style="text-align:center;" colspan="11"|  Redshirt
|-
| style="text-align:left;"| 2018–19
| style="text-align:left;"| Pittsburgh
| 31 || 16 || 21.0 || .445 || .188 || .541 || 3.8 || 1.2 || .6 || .3 || 5.8
|-
| style="text-align:left;"| 2019–20
| style="text-align:left;"| Hartford
| 23 || 23 || 35.0 || .514 || .154 || .630 || 9.7 || 1.7 || .8 || 1.1 || 18.7
|- class="sortbottom"
| style="text-align:center;" colspan="2"| Career
| 111 || 74 || 25.1 || .455 || .304 || .612 || 4.6 || 2.0 || .7 || .4 || 9.3

Personal life
Ellison is the son of Pervis Ellison, who was the top pick in the 1989 NBA draft. His mother Timi, ran track in college. Ellison's sister Aja played basketball at Maryland and helped the team reach the Final Four. Another sister, Seattle, attended Howard University on a track scholarship.

References

External links
Hartford Hawks bio
Pittsburgh Panthers bio
St. John's Red Storm bio

1996 births
Living people
American men's basketball players
Basketball players from New Jersey
College Park Skyhawks players
Hartford Hawks men's basketball players
Life Center Academy alumni
People from Voorhees Township, New Jersey
Pittsburgh Panthers men's basketball players
Shooting guards
Sportspeople from Camden County, New Jersey
St. John's Red Storm men's basketball players
United States men's national basketball team players